Carl Looft (né Knutsen; 9 February 1863 – 10 April 1943) was a Norwegian physician, and among the first pediatricians in Norway.

He was born in Bærum to physician Carl August Knutsen and Margery Henriette Caroline Louise Thaulow, and was a grandson of Heinrich Arnold Thaulow. In 1892 he married Sofie Bolette Gran.

Looft graduated as cand.med. in 1889. His thesis from 1897 was a treatment of mental disability among children. From 1890 to 1940 he practiced as pediatrician in Bergen. In addition to his work as physician, he was responsible for a series of epidemiological investigations among children. Among his conclusions was that appropriate nutrition during pregnancy and infancy was an important factor for the mental development of the children.

References

1863 births
1943 deaths
People from Bærum
Norwegian pediatricians